Outaouais is a region of Quebec, Canada.

Outaouais may also refer to:

 The French name for the Ottawa River, a large river in Ontario and Quebec, Canada
 The French name for the indigenous Odawa people, namesakes of the river and several other places in North America